Dorothy Day (born 1896) was an American plant physiologist.

Education and career
Dorothy Day received an A.B. degree from Wellesley College in 1919; an M.S. from the University of Wisconsin in 1925; and her Ph.D. in plant physiology from that institution in 1927.  She also attended the University of Chicago in 1929 and Cornell University in 1942–1943.

Day's career encompassed positions in academia, with private corporations, and at government agencies.  Her teaching work began in 1921, as an instructor at Hood College.  She also taught and researched at the University of Wisconsin; Mills College; Smith College for twelve years, where she held the title of associate professor from 1937 to 1942; Cornell University; the University of Minnesota; MacMurray College, as associate professor from 1950 to 1952; Westminster College; and Brigham Young University as a visiting professor of botany in 1958 and 1960.  During World War II, job opportunities for women expanded, and as a result, she took her first positions in private industry.  She worked as a plant physiologist for the California Central Fibre Corporation (1943–1944); Alaska Research Laboratories as a microbiological consultant (1952–1954); and the Bio-Sci Information Exchange from 1954 to 1955.  Day was a microbiologist with the Quartermaster Corps from 1946 to 1949, and a mycologist for the Naval Shipyard in Philadelphia in 1949.  Her research interests included plant physiology, nutrition, and tissue culture.

In September 1935, Day attended the sixth International Botanical Congress in Amsterdam.

Selected publications

References

Bibliography
 

Cornell University alumni
1896 births
Plant physiologists
American women scientists
Wellesley College alumni
University of Wisconsin–Madison College of Letters and Science alumni
Year of death missing
University of Chicago alumni